Jaakko Rintanen (18 October 1900 – 14 July 1971) was a Finnish sports shooter. He competed at the 1936 Summer Olympics and 1948 Summer Olympics.

References

External links
 

1900 births
1971 deaths
People from Seinäjoki
Finnish male sport shooters
Olympic shooters of Finland
Shooters at the 1936 Summer Olympics
Shooters at the 1948 Summer Olympics
Sportspeople from South Ostrobothnia